John James Davis (May 5, 1835 – March 19, 1916) was an American attorney and politician who helped found West Virginia and later served as a United States representative in Congress from that state.

Early and family life
John James Davis was born in Clarksburg, Virginia (now West Virginia) in 1835 to master saddler John Davis (1797–1863) and his New York born wife Eliza Arnold Steen Davis (1799–1866). He had a younger brother, Rezin Caleb Davis (1847-1910, who initially apprenticed with their father, but was a Confederate soldier and later became a lawyer in Kentucky). The family included at least two sisters: Regina (b. 1837) and Ann (b. 1839). Their grandfather Caleb Davis (1767–1834) had been born across the Potomac River at Oldtown, Allegheny County, Maryland but had moved to Woodstock, Shenandoah County, Virginia where J. J. Davis's father John Davis had been born. After learning his trade, John Davis moved to Clarksburg shortly before Virginia authorized construction of the Northwestern Turnpike. John Davis served as the Harrison County sheriff, ruling elder in his Presbyterian church and (unlike his son John James Davis) sympathized with the Confederacy and died in 1863. His wife Eliza (J.J. Davis' mother) was a pioneer school teacher in Harrison County, who taught Stonewall Jackson as well as her sons and many other local children. Either the father John Davis  or this J.J. Davis owned 6 slaves in Harrison County in 1860, and his brother Rezin Davis owned two slaves (a 17 year old girl and a one year old boy).

Young J. J. Davis attended the Northwestern Virginia Academy at Clarksburg (the Harrison County seat). When he was 17, he moved to Lexington, Virginia to attend the Lexington Law School (now the law department of Washington and Lee University). Graduating in 1856, J. J. Davis was admitted to the Virginia bar that same year and began what would become his life-long legal practice in Clarksburg.

On August 21, 1862, John J. Davis married Anna Kennedy (1841–1917) in Baltimore, Maryland, her home city. She was the daughter of a lumber merchant and college-educated. They later had a son John W. Davis (1873–1955); who followed his father's career and became a lawyer and Congressman, although he also left West Virginia and was an unsuccessful Democratic Presidential candidate in 1924). They also had four daughters: Lillie Davis Preston (1863–1939) of Lewisburg, West Virginia, Emma Kennedy Davis (1865–1943) who never married and was secretary of the local Red Cross in World War I as well as assistant chair of the Harrison County Democratic committee, Anna Holmes Davis Richardson (1869-1945; whose first husband was a Uniterian minister in New York), and Catherine Estelle Davis (1874–1881).

American Civil War
Davis became politically active after the Virginia Secession Convention of 1861 on April 17, 1861 voted to approve an ordinance of secession over the opposition of many delegates from the northwestern counties (including fellow lawyer John S. Carlile from Harrison County). Carlile called a mass meeting in Clarksburg on April 22, 1861 to call Virginia's secession treasonous and consider responses. Davis attended that "Clarksburg Convention."

On May 13–15, J.J. Davis was among seven Harrison County men attending the Wheeling Convention which established the Restored Government of Virginia.

In June 1861, Harrison County voters elected Davis and John C. Vance to represent them in the Virginia House of Delegates which met in Wheeling from July 1–26; he never served in Richmond, Virginia (the normal meeting place of the Virginia General Assembly, including during the American Civil War). In October, 1861, Harrison County voters elected Vance and J.J. Davis as their two delegates to the General Assembly at Wheeling which met from December 2, 1861 – February 13, 1862, and from May 6–15, 1862, and from December 4, 1862-February 5, 1863 (although Vance resigned on January 2, 1862).

Despite Davis' Unionist advocacy, his father remained a Confederate sympathizer and his brother Rezin enlisted in the Confederate army.

Postwar career
As the war ended, Davis continued his legal practice in Clarksburg, and voters elected him to the West Virginia House of Delegates in 1869. He served one term in that part time position (1870).

Active in his local Democratic Party, Davis was a delegate to the Democratic National Conventions in 1868, 1876 and 1892. He also was a Mason, regent of the University of West Virginia, a member of the Board of Visitors of the United States Military Academy at West Point, director of the State Insane Hospital, and a ruling elder in the Southern Presbyterian Church.

National politics
When Republican Issac H. Duval announced that he would not seek re-election from West Virginia's 1st congressional district, Davis was the Democratic candidate and won. He served in the 42nd Congress, and was re-elected as an Independent Democrat to the 43rd Congress. He decided against running for renomination in 1874, and fellow Democrat Benjamin Wilson won the seat.

His elective political years over, except for stints at the Democratic National Conventions and as a Presidential elector for Grover Cleveland, Davis resumed his legal practice in Clarksburg, which came in second in the 1877 contest to become West Virginia's state capitol. However, the Republican Party grew stronger in the area, led by Nathan Goff, Jr., who defeated Wilson in 1883. Eventually, Davis practiced with his son, John W. Davis, who began his personal political career by winning election to the West Virginia House of Delegates in 1899. Although the U.S. congressional seat was generally held by Republicans (other than twice briefly held by Democrat John O. Pendleton), Davis lived to see his son win it in 1910, then resign to become the U.S. Solicitor General under Democratic President Woodrow Wilson.

Death and legacy
John J. Davis died in Clarksburg, Harrison County on March 19, 1916, and was interred in what was then the Odd Fellows Cemetery, where his wife of nearly 55 years joined him less than a year later. Their daughter Emma, who never married, remained active in  Democratic politics in Clarksburg. After serving as Solicitor General, his son John Davis would because U.S. Ambassador to Britain, then move to New York.

References

1835 births
1916 deaths
19th-century American lawyers
20th-century American lawyers
Members of the Virginia House of Delegates
Members of the West Virginia House of Delegates
Politicians from Clarksburg, West Virginia
Washington and Lee University School of Law alumni
West Virginia lawyers
Delegates of the 1861 Wheeling Convention
Democratic Party members of the United States House of Representatives from West Virginia
Independent Democrat members of the United States House of Representatives
West Virginia Independents
19th-century American politicians
Lawyers from Clarksburg, West Virginia